The Diocese of Cephalonia and Zakynthos was Roman Catholic diocese located on the Ionian Island of Cephalonia. It was suppressed in 1919.

History
The Frankish Crusaders of the County palatine of Cephalonia and Zakynthos established the diocese, which survived their rule, in the early 13th century. On 3 June 1919 the residential see was suppressed but immediately transformed into a titular bishopric, its territory and title being merged into the Metropolitan Archdiocese of Corfu–Zakynthos–Cephalonia. In 1921 this was also suppressed, never having had an incumbent.

Ordinaries

Diocese of Cephalonia
Erected: 13th Century
Latin Name: Cephaloniensis

 Benedetto (1207.03.23 – 1208)
 Giovanni di Stefano (? – 1252.06.13), later Bishop of Numana (1252.06.13 – 1254.02.09), Bishop of Cefalù (Italy) (1254.02.09 – 1269)
 Palmerio de Gallucio (1252.11.10 – ?)
 Enrico Padovano (1264 – 1273)
 Neruccio (? – death 1340)
 Niccolò (1341? – ?)
 Emmanuele, Benedictine Order (O.S.B.) (1350.06.14 – ?)
 Daniele (? – death 1370)
 Percivalle di Aleria (1370.03.06 – death 1375)
 Angelo di Crotone, Augustinian Order (O.E.S.A.) (1375.06.22 – death 1383)
 Princivalle (1385 – 1385)

Diocese of Cephalonia and Zakynthos
United: 1386
Latin Name: Cephaloniensis et Zacynthiensis
Metropolitan: Archdiocese of Corfu

 Biagio, O.E.S.A. (1385 – 1396.01.12), later Metropolitan Archbishop of Corinth (1396.01.12 – ?)
 Pietro Giovanni de Baraballis, Friars Minor (O.F.M.) (1396.01.12 – 1398), formerly Metropolitan Archbishop of Acerenza (Italy) (1392 – 1395.03.15), Archbishop of Matera (Italy) (1392 – 1395.03.15), Metropolitan Archbishop of Corinth (1395.03.15 – 1396.01.12)
 Pietro Giovanni, O.F.M. (1396.01.12 – 1398)
 Gregorio Nardi (1400.11.29 – 1427.10.15), later Bishop of Segni (Italy) (1427.10.15 – death 1429)
 Antonio Morelli (1427.10.17 – 1430), later Bishop of Trevico (Italy, 1431.12.20 – ?)
 Domenico de Pupio (1430.03.23 – death 1437)
 Giovanni de Pede (1437.02.25 – death 1443), previously Bishop of Ostuni (Italy) (1423 – 1437.02.25)
 Giovanni Giacomo, O.E.S.A. (1443.02.27 – ?)
 Giovanni di Arcadia (1458.01.31 – death 1463)
 Giovanni Antonio Scardemeto, O.F.M. (1463.10.23 – 1488)
 Marco de Franceschi (1488 – death 1521)
 Ferdinando de Medici (1521.08.09 – death 1550)
 Giovanni Francesco Commendone (1555.10.25 – 1560), later papal diplomat: Apostolic Nuncio to Poland (1563.09 – 1565.12), created Cardinal-Deacon of San Ciriaco alle Terme Diocleziane pro illa vice Deaconry (1566.11.15 – 1573?), promoted Cardinal-Priest of the same S. Ciriaco alle Terme Diocleziane (1573? – 1574.07.05), transferred Cardinal-Priest of Santa Maria degli Angeli (1574.07.05 – 1584.01.09), next Cardinal-Priest of S. Anastasia (1584.01.09 – 1584.05.14), finally Cardinal-Priest of San Marco (1584.05.14 – death 1584.12.26)
 Giovanni Pietro Dolfin, Canons Regular of Saint Augustine (C.R.S.A.) (1560.03.27 – 1574)
 Paolo Grassi, Canons Regular of the Lateran (C.R.L.) (1574.07.14 – death 1588)
 Domenico Carlo, Conventual Franciscans (O.F.M. Conv.) (1589.06.26 – 1595)
 Raffaele Inviziati (1597.01.24 – 1611)
 Marco Pasqualigo (1611.10.10 – death 1624)
 Giovanni Michele de Varolis, O.F.M. Conv. (1625.01.27 – 1634)
 Costantino de Rossi, Somascans (C.R.S.) (1634.06.24 – 1640.08.13), later Bishop of Krk (Croatia) (1640.08.13 – death 1653)
 Giovanni de Rossi (1640.12.03 – 1645.07.10), later Bishop of Chiron (1645.07.10 – 1653.11.10), Bishop of Osor (1653.11.10 – death 1667)
 Francesco Gozzadini (1654.03.02 – death 1673.02.16)
 Giacinto Maria Conigli, Dominican Order (O.P.) (1675.05.06 – 1694.10.07)
 Epifanio Fanelli, O.S.B. (1695.09.19 – 1697)
 José Sanz de Villaragut, O.F.M. (1696.06.18 – death 1698.08.29), previously Bishop of Gaeta (Italy) (1683.12.06 – 1693.01.02), Bishop of Pozzuoli (Italy) (1693.01.02 – 1696.06.18)
 Giovanni Vicenzo de Filippi, Servites (O.S.M.) (1698.12.10 – 1718.05.11), later Bishop of Caorle (1718.05.11 – death 1738.02.16)
 Giovanni Crisostomo Calvi, O.P. (1718.05.11 – 1729.09.07), later Bishop of Montefeltro (Italy) (1729.09.07 – death 1747.04.27)
 Giuseppe Caccia, O.F.M. (1729.11.28 – 1731.01.08), later Bishop of Traù (1731.01.08 – retired 1737.08.29)
 Cesare Bonajuti (1731.01.22 – 1736.02.27), later Bishop of Hvar (Croatia) (1736.02.27 – 1759)
 Baldassarre Maria Remondini (1736.02.27 – death 1777.10.05)
 Bernardo Bocchini, O.F.M. Cap. (1778.09.28 – death 1785.01.16)
 Francesco Mercati (1785.09.26 – death 1803)
 Aloisio Scacoz, O.F.M. (1815.08.08 – 1831.11.13), emeritate as Titular Archbishop of Stauropolis (1831.12.02 – death 1842.02.22)
 Luigi Lastaria (1831.11.04 – death 1870)
 Evangelista Boni, O.F.M. Cap. (1872.06.07 – 1885.01.11), later Bishop of Corfu (insular Greece) (1885.01.11 – death 1897.08.19)
 Dionisio Nicolosi (1885.05.05 – 1890.06.06), later Bishop of Chios (insular Greece) (1890.06.06 – death 1916.01.25)
 Apostolic Administrator Domenico Darmanin (1913 – 1919.02.17), while Bishop of Corfu (insular Greece) (1912.03.04 – 1919.02.17)

References

Former Roman Catholic dioceses in Greece
Roman Catholic dioceses established in the 13th century
Roman Catholic dioceses in the Crusader states
Catholic titular sees in Europe
History of Cephalonia
History of Zakynthos
County palatine of Cephalonia and Zakynthos